Parapistocalamus is a genus of venomous snake in the family Elapidae.

Species
The genus Parapistocalamus contains the sole species Parapistocalamus hedigeri, commonly known as Hediger's coral snake.

Etymology
The specific name, hedigeri, is in honor of Swiss biologist Heini Hediger.

Geographic range
P. hedigeri is found in Papua New Guinea.

Description
P. hedigeri is a small slender snake. The head is only slightly wider than the neck. The eye is small, and the pupil is round. The smooth dorsal scales are arranged in 15 rows at midbody. Dorsally, it is uniform brown, and ventrally it is yellowish. It may have a lighter collar.

Habitat
The preferred habitat of P. hedigeri is forest.

Behavior
P. hedigeri is crepuscular or nocturnal. It burrows in leaf litter and rotten logs.

Reproduction
P. hediger is probably oviparous.

References

Further reading
Roux J (1934). "Contribution à la connaissance de la faune erpétologique des îles Salomon ". Verhandlungen der Naturforschenden Gesellschaft in Basel 45: 77–81. (Parapistocalamus hedigeri, new genus and species). (in French).

Elapidae
Monotypic snake genera
Reptiles of Papua New Guinea
Reptiles described in 1934
Endemic fauna of Papua New Guinea
Snakes of New Guinea